Corymbia greeniana is a species of tree that is endemic to northern Australia. It has rough bark on some or all of the trunk and larger branches, smooth bark above, broadly lance-shaped to egg-shaped adult leaves, flower buds usually in groups of seven, creamy white flowers and urn-shaped fruit with a distinct neck.

Description
It has rough, loose, flaky, tessellated brownish bark on some or all of the trunk, sometimes also on the larger branches, smooth white and pale grey bark above. Flowering occurs from January to May and the flowers are creamy white.

Taxonomy and naming
This eucalypt was first formally described in 1987 by Denis Carr and Stella Carr and was given the name Eucalyptus greeniana. In 1995 Ken Hill and Lawrie Johnson changed the name to Corymbia greeniana. The specific epithet (greeniana) honours Marjorie Free (née Marjorie Green), an herbarium curator.

Distribution and habitat
Corymbia greeniana grows on red and yellow sand soils, sometimes on basalt or volcanic rocks in open savannah woodland. It occurs in the Kimberley, Western Australia region of Western Australia and east through the Top End between Katherine and Mataranke in the Northern Territory to Doomadgee and scattered areas of the southern Cape York Peninsula in Queensland.

References

greeniana
Rosids of Western Australia
Flora of the Northern Territory
Flora of Queensland
Myrtales of Australia
Plants described in 1987
Taxa named by Maisie Carr